Jason Miles (born August 12, 1980) is an American professional stock car racing owner-driver. He is currently scheduled to compete part-time in both the NASCAR Xfinity Series and the ARCA Menards Series for his own team, Miles Thomas Motorsports.

Racing career

Early career 
Miles would get his start at the age of six, first racing go-karts. Within years, he would move up to late models, driving for Dale Earnhardt, Inc., finding success with numerous wins across the late model scene. However, in 1999, he would suffer what was thought at the time a career-ending crash.

In 2015, he would race in a test session as his comeback to racing. In 2019, he would make his first race in the ARCA Menards Series, finishing 18th.

NASCAR career 
In September 2021, Miles would announce that along with long-time racing fan Mark Thomas, they would create their own team called Miles Thomas Motorsports. Miles, driving for the team, is scheduled to run part-time in both the NASCAR Xfinity Series and the ARCA Menards Series.

Motorsports career results

ARCA Menards Series 
(key) (Bold – Pole position awarded by qualifying time. Italics – Pole position earned by points standings or practice time. * – Most laps led.)

ARCA Menards Series East

References

External links 
 
 Official website

1980 births
Living people
ARCA Menards Series drivers
NASCAR drivers
Racing drivers from Charlotte, North Carolina
Racing drivers from North Carolina
Sportspeople from North Carolina